Worms Crazy Golf is a 2011 action game developed by Team17. A sequel to the mobile-exclusive Worms Golf, the game uses the basic framework of the Worms series as the foundation for a 2D golf title.

Gameplay
The game utilizes a side-on two-dimensional playfield, as in the core Worms series.  The goal is to putt a ball from the starting point on the map to the hole in as few turns (or strokes) as possible.  There are also coins to be collected on each map which can be used to purchase unlockables including costumes, golf clubs and balls. Additionally there are Sheep on the field that can be caused to explode by the ball, and weapon crates containing perks and utilities. The game does not feature online play of any kind.

Aesthetically, the game draws from the third 2D generation of the Worms series, specifically Worms 2: Armageddon and Worms Reloaded. To celebrate the release of Worms Crazy Golf a golf-themed terrain style was added to the Microsoft Windows version of Worms Reloaded as free DLC.

Reception

Worms Crazy Golf was met with mixed to positive reviews. It holds Metacritic scores of 85/100 and 61/100 for iOS and the PlayStation 3, and 81% and 64% for iOS and the PlayStation 3 respectively on GameRankings. Keza MacDonald of IGN gave the iPad version of a game a 9 out of 10 score praising its unique game layouts and humor. GamingLives gave the game an 8 out of 10 score criticizing its camera but praising its beautiful art style.

References

2011 video games
Golf video games
IOS games
MacOS games
PlayStation 3 games
PlayStation Network games
Video games developed in the United Kingdom
Windows games
Golf